Chagay may refer to:
 Chagai (disambiguation), several entities in Pakistan
 Haggai, a Hewbrew prophet
 Chagay, a Koryo-saram spelling of the Korean name Cha

See also 
 Chagatai (disambiguation)